Boreolestes sylvestris is a species of predatory air-breathing land slug, a shell-less pulmonate gastropod mollusk in the family Trigonochlamydidae.

Distribution
The type locality for Boreolestes sylvestris is 6 km from Ghooseriple at the Molchepa riverside in North-Western Caucasus, Republic of Adygea, Russia.

The distribution of Boreolestes sylvestris includes the upper part of the Belaya River basin.

References

Trigonochlamydidae
Gastropods described in 1999